Pinia (pronounced /piːnjʌ/, or "peenya" in English) is a store library and state management framework for Vue.js. Designed primarily for building front-end web applications, it uses declarative syntax and offers its own state management API. Pinia was endorsed by the Vue.js team as a credible alternative to Vuex and is currently the official state management library for Vue.

Overview 
Unlike Vuex, Pinia is modular by design and does not include mutations. This enables developers to create numerous stores and import them into components as needed. The framework provides a centralised store with a built-in mechanism for saving, updating and retrieving application state.

History 
Pinia was conceived by Vue developer Eduardo San Martin Morote as an exploration of what Vuex could look like in the future. This involved creating a simpler API with "less ceremony" and providing better support for type inference with TypeScript. It became an official part of the Vue.js ecosystem on February 7, 2022.

The store library takes its name from piña, the Spanish word for "pineapple." According to its creators, "a pineapple is in reality a group of individual flowers that join together to create a multiple fruit. Similar to stores, each one is born individually, but they are all connected at the end."

Features

Store pillars 
Stores in Pinia are defined via a JavaScript object with a variety of characteristics that govern their behaviour. These are regarded as the "pillars" of a store, and as shown in the code example below, include id, state, getters and actions.
import { createStore } from 'pinia'

export const useCounterStore = createStore({
  id: 'counter',

  state: => ({
    count: 0
  }),

  getters: {
    doubleCount: state => state.count * 2
  },

  actions: {
    increment(amount) {
      this.state.count += amount
    }
  }
})

Devtools support 
Pinia integrates with Vue Devtools, a popular extension for debugging Vue.js applications.

Support for plugins 
The framework includes support for multiple plugins, including Nuxt and the aforementioned Devtools.

Hot module replacement 
Pinia allows developers to maintain existing states while writing code and to modify stores without reloading the page.

Limitations 
As of January 2023, Vuex has a larger online community, which provides developers with better support than Pinia. However, this is expected to change over time, as Pinia grows in popularity.

See also 
 Vue.js
 Vite
Software Planet Group

References

External links 
 
 

2019 software
JavaScript libraries
Software using the MIT license